"Buy It in Bottles" is a song by English singer-songwriter Richard Ashcroft and is the second track on his 2002 album Human Conditions. The song was also released as the third and final single from that album in the United Kingdom on 7 April 2003, peaking at number 26 in the UK Singles Chart (see 2003 in British music).

Track listings
 7" HUT167
 "Buy It in Bottles" (single edit) – 3:51
 "Don't Take Me In" – 4:07
 CD HUTCD167
 "Buy It in Bottles" (single edit) – 3:51
 "Don't Take Me In" – 4:07
 "The Journey’s Just Begun" – 6:41
 "Buy It in Bottles" (video)
 DVD HUTDVD167
 "Buy It in Bottles" (album version) – 4:39
 "Buy It in Bottles" (alternate video)
 "Buy It in Bottles" (live performance footage)

2002 songs
2003 singles
Hut Records singles
Richard Ashcroft songs
Song recordings produced by Chris Potter (record producer)
Songs written by Richard Ashcroft